The following is a list of the 40 municipalities (comuni) of the Province of Fermo, Marche, Italy.

List

See also
List of municipalities of Italy

References

Fermo